Mrągowo  (until 1947) is a resort town in the Warmian-Masurian Voivodeship of northeastern Poland, with 21,889 inhabitants (2019). It is the capital of Mrągowo County and the seat (though not part of) the Gmina Mrągowo.

History

Middle Ages
About 1348 the Teutonic Knights constructed a wooden fortress near present-day Mrągowo named Sensburg, derived from Old Prussian senas meaning "old", therefore maybe at the site of a former Prussian castle. The settlement that began to develop nearby was first mentioned in a 1397 deed and probably had already received Kulm town rights between 1404 and 1407, although it is verified that Grand Master Konrad von Erlichshausen affirmed town rights in 1444. As a result of the Thirteen Years’ War (1454–1466) the settlement came under Polish suzerainty as a fief.

Modern era

Sensburg became part of the Duchy of Prussia, a vassal state of Poland, in 1525. In the 15th and 16th centuries, the town suffered through fires and plagues.

Part of the Kingdom of Prussia since 1701, the town was incorporated into the Province of East Prussia after its creation in 1773. It was heavily devastated during the Napoleonic Wars. It remained mostly a small hamlet in the  largely rural area around it. Agriculture, fishing and the richness of the surrounding forests provided the sources of income for the local population. Just like all of Masuria the district was inhabited mainly by Poles, and town itself had majority Polish population in 1816 however in the 19th century their percentage began to decrease due to Germanisation, removal of the Polish language from schools and the pressure of the local German administration (from 86% in 1825 to 59% in 1890). The town became the county seat in 1818, with its first Landrat (country executive) being August von Lyśniewski. In 1871 Sensburg became part of the German Empire during the Prussian-led unification of Germany. In 1897 the town became connected to the railway system, which went from Bischofsburg (Biskupiec) to Rastenburg (Kętrzyn/Rastembork). In 1903 the city received a donation from Edward Pałasz to acquire its own forest, where it then built recreational facilities.

Following World War I, as a condition of the Treaty of Versailles, the League of Nations held the East Prussian plebiscite on 11 July 1920 to determine if the people in the southern districts of East Prussia wanted to remain within the Free State of Prussia and Germany or to join the Second Polish Republic. Before the vote German nationalists engaged in brutal excesses, which remained unhindered by meagre presence of Allied forces; a Scottish regiment only once visited the city, and only to demonstrate a music orchestra. The plebiscite resulted in 3,660 votes for Germany and none for Poland.
At the end of World War II the town was overrun by the Red Army during the East Prussian Offensive and lost almost 20% of its buildings. The German population remaining after the evacuation was largely expelled after the war and replaced with Poles. From 1945 to 1947 the city was known by the historic Polish name Ządzbork. The city's name was changed to the current Mrągowo in 1947, in honor of Polish pastor, writer and translator Krzysztof Celestyn Mrongovius (1764–1855), a noted defender of the Polish language in Masuria.

After the war Mrągowo remained a rural town with approximately 10,000 inhabitants; this number stayed almost constant until the late 1980s. In the following decade, mostly due to economic and political changes, the town gained some influence in the region and grew quickly into a regional center for economic business and tourism. Recently Mrągowo has tried to regain some of its former beauty and to represent the region.

Coat of arms
The town's coat of arms derives from a local story of the 15th century. It claims that when a group of local farmers was being threatened by predators, the townspeople tracked down a fearsome bear. They were only able to shoot it in its paw, and it managed to flee to Rastembork. Only upon its arrival there did the bear succumb to its injuries. The bear's paw was brought back to Sensburg and is honored in the coat of arms.

International relations

Twin towns — Sister cities
Mrągowo is twinned with:
 Grünberg, Germany – since 1993
 Limanowa, Poland – since 2006
 Łańcut, Poland – since 2020
 Zelenogradsk, Russia

Notable people
Przemysław Kulig (b. 1980), Polish footballer
 Natalia Nykiel (b. 1995), Polish singer
 Joachim Philipkowski (b. 1961), soccer player
 Radosław Pindiur (b. 1988), Canadian-Polish footballer
 Georg Riedel (1676–1738), composer

References

External links

Official website
Mrągowo at e-Masuren.com 
See pictures from the Antonio Mucherino's web site

Cities and towns in Warmian-Masurian Voivodeship
Mrągowo County